The Russian warship Moskva, the flagship of the Russian Navy's Black Sea Fleet, sank on 14 April 2022 during the Russian invasion of Ukraine. Ukrainian officials said that their forces damaged the ship with two R-360 Neptune anti-ship missiles, and there was a fire, information which was later confirmed by the United States Department of Defense. Russia reported the ship sank in stormy seas after the fire caused munitions to explode.

The cruiser is the largest Russian warship to be sunk in wartime since the end of World War II and the first Russian flagship sunk since the Knyaz Suvorov in 1905, during the Russo-Japanese War.

Russia said that 396 crew members had been evacuated, with one sailor killed and 27 missing, but there are unverified reports of more casualties. At least 17 of the missing crew members were later declared dead by a court in Sevastopol.

Background
In February 2022, the flagship of Russia's Black Sea Fleet, the guided missile cruiser Moskva, left Sevastopol to participate in the 2022 Russian invasion of Ukraine. The ship was later used against the Ukrainian armed forces during the attack on Snake Island, together with the Russian patrol boat Vasily Bykov. Moskva hailed the island's garrison over the radio and demanded its surrender, receiving the now-famous reply "Russian warship, go fuck yourself" from its garrison. After this, all contact was lost with Snake Island, and the thirteen-member Ukrainian garrison was captured.

Sinking

Ukrainian account
The first known report of a missile hitting the ship was at 20:42, 13 April 2022 Ukrainian time (EEST, UTC+03:00) with a Facebook post by  a Ukrainian volunteer connected to the military: “The cruiser Moskva has just been hit by 2 Neptune missiles. It is standing [not sunk], burning. And there is a storm at sea. Tactical flooding is required, apparently." Later that evening presidential adviser Oleksiy Arestovych reported Moskva was on fire in rough seas and Odesa governor Maksym Marchenko officially confirmed that Ukrainian forces hit Moskva with two R-360 Neptune anti-ship missiles, which "caused very serious damage." At 12:43, 14 April EEST, the Ukrainian Southern Command posted a video on Facebook with a report stating the ship had received damage within the range of the Neptune anti-ship missile, there was a fire and other vessels in Moskvas group "tried to help, but a storm and a powerful explosion of ammunition overturned the cruiser and it began to sink."

Russian account
Hours after Marchenko's claim, the Russian Ministry of Defense said that a fire had caused munitions to explode and that the ship had been seriously damaged, without any statement of cause or reference to a Ukrainian strike.
The ministry said on 14 April that the missile systems of the cruiser were undamaged, the fire was contained by sailors, and that efforts were underway to tow the ship to port. Later on 14 April, the Russian ministry said that Moskva sank while being towed during stormy weather, On 15 April, the sinking was briefly reported on Russian news media and television, where it was said to be due to "stormy seas".

Other early observations
The United States Department of Defense spokesman John Kirby said early on 14 April that they did not have enough information to confirm a missile strike, but could not rule it out. Imagery they had examined showed the ship had suffered a sizable explosion. The cause of the explosion was not clear. The ship appeared to be moving under its own power, probably heading to Sevastopol for repairs. A defense department spokesman later stated it was unclear whether the vessel was moving under her own power or being towed. A senior Defense Department official, who spoke on condition of anonymity, stated the ship was "battling a fire on board, but we do not know the extent of the damage” but it was "big" and "extensive."

An analysis suggested this was not long after the damage occurred which caused the ship to eventually sink. In the image, the cruiser is accompanied by other vessels.

At 02:59, 14 April 2022 [EEST], the Reverse Side of the Medal, a Telegram channel associated with the Russian paramilitary Wagner Group, posted the following: "According to unconfirmed reports, the flagship of the Black Sea Fleet, the cruiser Moskva, sank." And, according to their "preliminary information, was indeed attacked by the Neptune anti-ship missiles from the coastline between Odesa and Nikolaev. Also, the forces of the ship were diverted to counter the Bayraktar TB-2 UAV. The blow fell on the port side, as a result of which the ship took a strong roll. After the threat of detonation of ammunition, the crew of about 500 people was evacuated."

At 10:59, 14 April 2022 [EEST], the Lithuanian defense minister, Arvydas Anušauskas, reported on Facebook that an SOS signal was sent at 01:05, the cruiser rolled onto its side at 01:14, and the electricity went out half an hour later. "From 2 a.m., a Turkish ship evacuated 54 sailors from the cruiser, and at about 3 a.m., Turkey and Romania reported that the ship was completely sunk." According to the Albanian website Politiko, a Turkish official denied to BBC News that a Turkish ship rescued any Russian crew.

In the afternoon of 14 April, US Defense Department spokesman Kirby confirmed the ship had sunk but said they were unable to confirm what caused the ship to sink, although the Ukrainian account was "certainly plausible." Speculating about the cause of the explosion, he stated: "Certainly, it could have been damage from some external force, like a missile or an attack of some kind, a torpedo or something like that ... but it could also be something that happens inside the skin of the ship – an engineering fire, a fuel fire. You just don't know."

Missile strike

The official also said intelligence appraisals indicated there were casualties at the time of the strike, but he did not know how many.

On 5 May, a US official said that the US gave "a range of intelligence" to assist in the sinking of the Moskva. However, the decision to strike was purely a Ukrainian one. There was a US Navy P-8A Poseidon maritime surveillance aircraft in the area before the sinking. The P-8A from Italy was patrolling within its radar range over the Black Sea and the US, when asked, did identify the ship as the Moskva as part of intelligence sharing to help Ukraine defend against attack from Russian ships. The US Department of Defense spokesman John Kirby stated: "There was no provision of targeting information by any United States Navy P-8 flying in these air policing missions."

Moskva was equipped with a triple-tiered air defense that could have provided an adequate chance of intercepting the incoming Neptune missiles, with 3–4 minutes of radar detection warning. There was no record that the crew had activated these systems, including the S-300F and OSA surface-to-air missiles, chaff or decoys, electronic jamming, or the last-ditch AK-630 close-in weapon systems. Tayfun Ozberk, a Turkey correspondent for Defense News, suggested that the ship's radars either failed to detect the incoming Neptune missiles or that the defenses were not ready to engage the detected threat, implying a lack of crew training for such emergency scenarios.

The operation to sink Moskva may have been assisted by the use of at least one Bayraktar TB2 drone (UCAV), which seems to have observed the event and may have played other roles in the ship's sinking. The Telegram post by the Wagner Group and a Ukrainian official said the drone "diverted" or "distracted" the crew, but David Hambling, a technology journalist writing in Forbes, considered this unlikely, since the ship's anti-drone and anti-missile defenses were provided by two different systems: the long-range SA-N-6 Grumble (S-300F) missiles against the drone and the multibarreled AK-630 cannons against the Neptune missiles.

Several reports were consistent with Bayraktar drones being in the same area as the ship. Arda Mevlutoglu, a defense industry analyst, stated that a Bayraktar TB2 ground-control station was seen in Odesa on 10 April. A video released by the Russian military on 12 April showed a missile being launched from the Russian frigate Admiral Essen and stated it destroyed a Bayraktar drone near the Crimean coast. A Ukrainian video "shot from the air with a night vision scope," claimed to show Moskva burning in the distance, and could have been made by a Bayraktar drone flying in the area.

Analysts stated the Bayraktar drone may also have provided targeting information. Can Kasapoglu, the director of security and defense studies at a Turkish think tank, the Center for the Economics and Foreign Policy Studies (EDAM), said: "Reports that Turkish TB2 drones were involved in the attack either as a distraction for Moskva or as location spotter of Moskva are both quite possible." Mevlutoglu mentioned that Rear Admiral Oleksiy Neizhpapa, commander of the Ukrainian naval forces, had in the past suggested that TB2 drones would be used with Neptune launchers for target reconnaissance. Mevlutoglu also said the main radar system on Moskva was out of date, designed to detect aircraft and cruise missiles. The TB2, with a lower radar cross-section and flight speed, may have been missed by the ship's radar.

The aviation journalist Valius Venckunas reported: "According to Arkady Babchenko, a Russian military journalist and an outspoken critic of Vladimir Putin, a Ukrainian Bayraktar disabled Moskva’s radar station, rendering it unable to detect and intercept incoming missiles. However, Babchenko has not provided the source of such information."

Danish military analyst Anders Puck Nielsen makes a case that operator fatigue could have been a significant factor. With such systems active, the cruiser was expected to survive several strikes from Neptune missiles ( warhead each) due to her large displacement; one salvo combat model scenario suggests that Ukraine would have needed to launch at least eleven Neptune missiles simultaneously; Moskva could have defeated six of them, with the remaining five getting through her defenses and striking the ship, causing just enough hull damage to sink her. However, this assumes that ship munitions were not detonated by the impact, so poor damage control, using conscripts instead of mid-grade professionals, and insufficient compartmentation have been suggested as contributing reasons to why the cruiser sank.

Images and video of the sinking ship
By 18 April, two images and a short 3-second video clip were circulating on social media showing Moskva after the fire broke out and prior to the final sinking. The images show the ship listing to port in daylight and calm sea, with signs of extensive fire damage around the central superstructure in addition to the presence of holes at the waterline, and most of her life rafts missing, indicating that some of the crew had evacuated by this point. According to CNN, "a large Russian rescue tug can be seen dousing the warship with water on the far  side."

The source or author of the video or images is unknown. The Telegraph reported the images were first posted to the web via Telegram on a channel linked to Russian security agencies. Analysts who were independently consulted by The Guardian and CNN confirmed that the images appear to show Moskva. The Guardian quoted Yörük Işık, a journalist and expert ship spotter, as saying: "I believe the video is real. What we see shape, size. It is the Moskva." The Guardian also reported: "He [Işık] said he believed at least one of the photographs was taken from a Project 22870 rescue tugship, of which Russia is believed to have two in the Black Sea."

A senior US defense official said the images could not be independently verified, "but the images themselves comport with what we had assessed to be the damage done to the ship." Carl Schuster, former director of operations at the US Pacific Command's Joint Intelligence Operations Center, stated: "Assuming the photo is not faked in some way or photo-shopped, it looks like the missile(s) hit forward, which is not unexpected. Anti-ship cruise missiles (ASCMs) tend to go for the center of the radar return, which typically is the forward section of the superstructure." Chris Parry, a former rear admiral, wrote to The Guardian: "It seems that one–two missiles entered the ship just below after the pair of Vulcan anti-ship missiles ... This would have caused massive internal damage and looks to have punctured the two missiles ... which would have drained down propellant fuel that further intensified the fire within the ship by spreading horizontally along the decks and through the damaged bulkheads." Naval experts consulted by the BBC considered damage to be consistent with a missile attack but disagreed with each other about the plausibility of other causes. The video does not show the storm stated in Russian reports.

Casualties
Lithuania's defense minister Arvydas Anušauskas said on 14 April that a distress signal had been sent from Moskva that day, and a Turkish ship responded, evacuating 54 personnel from the cruiser at 2 am, before she sank at 3 am. According to him, there were 485 crew on board, of whom 66 were officers. It was not known how many had survived.

Ukrainian sources reported on 15 April that some of Moskvas crew were killed, including First Rank Captain Anton Kuprin (age 43), the ship's commanding officer, at the time of the explosion. On 15 April, a senior US official said the government also believed there had been casualties. At a US Department of Defense briefing on 18 April, a senior defense official revealed they had also seen lifeboats in the water with sailors in them but did not have an accurate count. The independent Russian newspaper Novaya Gazeta Europe reported some 40 sailors had been killed at the time of the sinking. According to an eyewitness, there were some 200 injured sailors in a hospital in Crimea.

The Russian Ministry of Defense said soon after the sinking that the crew had been evacuated, and initially did not report any casualties; however, some relatives of sailors have been told that their family member was "missing". On 16 April, Russia released a video allegedly showing a meeting in Sevastopol with around 100 sailors of Moskva, along with Navy Commander-in-Chief Admiral Nikolay Yevmenov, who said that the sailors would continue their service in the Navy. According to independent Russian online newspaper The Insider, out of a complement of 500 to 700 crewmen, about 100 sailors, and notably the First Rank Captain of the ship Anton Kuprin, are visible in the video. Naval News reported that the Russian Defense Ministry video showed around 240 people survived, about half the crew. The Ukrainian edition of Radio Liberty, however, says that it is impossible to verify the authenticity of the video.

On 22 April, the Russian Defense Ministry released a statement confirming that one sailor from Moskva was killed and 27 were missing, while 396 crew members were rescued. Family members of crew serving aboard the Moskva allege that the number of missing sailors could be higher and that they have received no official information regarding their fate. At least 17 of the missing crew members were later declared dead by a court in Sevastopol.

Impact

Moskva is the largest Soviet or Russian warship to be sunk in action since World War II, when German aircraft bombed the Soviet battleship Marat, and the first loss of a Russian flagship in wartime since the 1905 sinking of the battleship Knyaz Suvorov during the Battle of Tsushima in the Russo-Japanese War. The last time a warship of comparable size was sunk was during the Falklands War in 1982, when the Argentine Navy cruiser ARA General Belgrano was sunk by the Royal Navy submarine . If Ukrainian claims are true, Moskva might be the largest warship ever disabled or destroyed by a missile, according to Carl Schuster, a retired US Navy captain and former director of operations at the US Pacific Command's Joint Intelligence Center.

The loss of Moskva is considered significant and humiliating to Russian president Vladimir Putin, but "more about psychological damage than material damage" according to Mykola Bielieskov from Ukraine's National Institute for Strategic Studies. He said that it would not completely lift Russia's naval blockade on Ukraine, but showed that Ukraine could employ sophisticated weaponry effectively. The Institute for the Study of War reached similar conclusions and said the loss of the ship may force Russia "to either deploy additional air and point-defense assets to the Black Sea battlegroup or withdraw vessels from positions near the Ukrainian coast." Russia moved 5 other warships further away from the Ukrainian coast.

Moskva was the only warship in Russia's Black Sea Fleet with the S-300F missile system for long-range air defense. She did not herself fire missiles at land targets in Ukraine, but she provided anti-aircraft support to vessels that did, and her sinking prompted Russian ships, now less protected, to move further offshore. Retired US Rear Admiral Samuel J. Cox, director of the Naval History and Heritage Command, told The New York Times that with the loss of the ship, in the newspaper's words, "any amphibious assault on Ukraine would be much more dangerous for Russia, with its landing and amphibious ships much more vulnerable to attacks."

In June 2022, Russian Vasily Bykov class corvettes were spotted fitted with ground-based Tor-M1/2 anti-air missile systems on deck, with analysts speculating that the arrangement was to compensate for the loss of seaborne air defense following the loss of the Moskva. Also in June, some of Russia's many gas platforms were attacked due to decreased area protection, about halfway between Crimea and occupied Snake Island. By August, the Russian Navy's ability to control the Black Sea had decreased as Odesa was no longer threatened from sea. However, the Russian Navy maintained ability to protect the export of products from Russia's interior.

While two sister ships of Moskva were deployed to the Eastern Mediterranean as of February 2022, Turkey has for the duration of the war closed the Turkish Straits to belligerent warships whose home port is not in the Black Sea, following the Montreux Convention. Thus, Russia cannot send ships to replace the lost Moskva from its other fleet bases without violating Turkish sovereignty.

In 2020, the archpriest of the Russian Orthodox Church Sevastopol District said that a fragment of the True Cross would be kept in Moskvas chapel. The True Cross is the cross on which believers say Jesus was crucified and a very rare relic important to many Christians. There was speculation after her sinking that the relic may have gone down with the ship.

Aftermath 

United States National Security Adviser Jake Sullivan said that the sinking of Moskva "is a big blow to Russia", with Moscow split between a narrative of incompetence and one of having been attacked. Sasaki Takahiro, guest professor on Russian security policy at Hiroshima University, stated in The Asahi Shimbun that the sinking of Moskva is compared with that of Yamato, the battleship of Imperial Japan. US Defense Department spokesman John Kirby said that Moskvas main mission was air defense for the Russian forces in the Black Sea and that her sinking "will have an impact on that capability, certainly in the near term".

According to an analysis by Forbes Ukraine on 14 April 2022, the sinking of Moskva is the most costly single loss for the Russian military in the war to date, and the ship would cost around US$750 million to replace.

Although Russia did not confirm that Ukrainian missiles had hit the ship, Reuters reported that in the morning of 15 April, Russia launched an apparent retaliatory missile strike against the missile factory Luch Design Bureau in Kyiv, where the Neptune missiles allegedly used in the attack were designed and manufactured.

The sinking of Moskva came two days after Ukrposhta released one million "Russian warship, go fuck yourself" stamps, which show a soldier giving the finger to Moskva. The sinking boosted sales of the stamp in Ukraine. Some people in Ukraine queued for more than two hours to get the stamp. The sinking of Moskva likely boosted the morale of many Ukrainians and negatively affected morale of the invading Russian forces. Oleksiy Neizhpapa, the commander of Ukrainian naval forces, was promoted as a reward for the sinking of Moskva.

Russian TV media only discussed the story briefly, while news articles described out-of-date fire-suppression systems and said that the sinking would not have an effect on the war. However, film director and former State Duma member Vladimir Bortko, described by the BBC as "clearly emotional", said (as a guest on a talk show) the fate of Moskva was grounds for war. On 18 April, Russia-1 state TV presenter Vladimir Solovyov criticised the Russian navy over the sinking; Russian commentator Sergei Markov, a strong Kremlin supporter, told the BBC Radio 4's The World at One that the cruiser had been struck by missiles shipped from Norway, and that her electronic defenses had been neutralised by the US. The Russian tabloid Komsomolskaya Pravda speculated that the ship had been hit by a Norwegian AGM-119 Penguin missile.

A Ukraine-based publication and two defense analysts wrote in the aftermath that Moskva had the capability to carry nuclear warheads and that she may have been carrying two nuclear warheads at the time of her sinking. They called for neighboring nations to launch an investigation into the possibility of a nuclear accident. There is a slight chance that the cruiser was carrying nuclear warheads for her P-500/P-1000 anti-ship missiles, but there is no evidence indicating that she was doing so. A senior U.S. defense official stated there were no nuclear weapons on the ship when she sank.

Ukraine declared the wreck of Moskva as having "underwater cultural heritage". The wreck "can be admired without much diving".

The Russian navy was reported to have sent the salvage ship  with the  submersible onboard to the wreck, as part of an eight-ship convoy. Worldwide, Kommuna is the oldest active-duty navy ship still in service, at 110 years old and inherited from the Imperial Russian Navy. Due to the size of Moskva and that she sank in one piece, bringing her to the surface is thought to be impractical. The aim is likely to recover encryption material, weapons, bodies, and other sensitive material that foreign powers might be interested in. Kommuna is based with the Black Sea Fleet and sails from Sevastopol. Her presence at the wreck site would expose her to attack by Ukrainian forces. On 24 May, Ukrainian sources claimed that Russia had spent the previous two weeks removing bodies and classified equipment from the wreck of the Moskva. According to Ukraine, five to seven ships were involved.

On 30 June, Russia retreated from Snake Island, the island that Moskva had attacked together with Vasily Bykov. The Ukrainian military set foot on Snake Island on 4 July and raised the Ukrainian flag over it.

On 4 November, a Sevastopol court declared 17 of the missing sailors of the Moskva dead.

References

April 2022 events in Ukraine
April 2022 events in Russia
Maritime incidents in 2022
Military history of the Black Sea
Naval magazine explosions
Russo-Ukrainian War
Shipwrecks of the 2022 Russian invasion of Ukraine
Southern Ukraine campaign
Naval history of Russia